Arthur Miles (born November 14, 1949 in Indianapolis) is an American blues, jazz and R&B musician, based in Italy.

Early life
Miles was born in Indiana but moved to California at a very young age, where he started his career as a singer in Richmond, San Francisco. The influence of the music of his uncle, the great guitarist Wes Montgomery, and his father's night club "Arthur's" allowed him to observe, absorb, and jam with some of the most famous blues, jazz and soul artists of the time, playing an important part in his musical education.

Career
Since the age of 14 he has played as a professional musician with his own bands. He perfected his singing technique at the School of Natural Voice at Los Angeles tutored by Patricia Warner, and contemporarily completed his formal studies in musical theory. He also majored in journalism at the Pasadena City College. While in Los Angeles his bands included The Curb Feelers, Good Clean Fun, Hardworking, and The Blues Shakers. In 1974 he spent several years in Japan, touring the entire country and performing in the principal cities with the Days Band.

He has subsequently worked as both an individual artist and vocalist supporting musicians such as Edwin Starr, José Feliciano, Big Joe Turner, Johnny Otis, Eddie "Clean-Headed" Vincent, Tina Turner, and Jimmy Bo Horn. He toured with The Blues Society performing all over California.

In 1984 Miles moved to Italy where he still resides. He started working with many Italian artists, including Paolo Conte, Loredana Bertè, Pierangelo Bertoli, and Andrea Mingardi. He has participated in the festivals Carnevale di Venezia and Umbria Jazz Festival, and has made appearances in television shows such as Festivalbar, Torno Sabato, Domenica In, La Bella e la Bestia, Nonsolomoda and Cantagiro.
 
Following a gig at the Scimmie Jazz Club in Milan, he was invited by Renzo Arbore to participate in his popular TV show Quelli della notte on Rai 2. His voice interpreted the Frank Raya Band hit "Eyah! Eyah!" featured on the album The King of Money.

In 1987, Miles began to work with Zucchero, singing on his records Blue's, Oro incenso e birra, Spirito Divino and Shake. His is the Reverend's introduction in "Diavolo im me" ("Devil In Me"). Zucchero's most successful hits like "Senza una donna" ("Without a Woman"), "Hey Man", "Baila", "Ahum" include Miles' participation. He also performed in Zucchero's LP Fly, released in September 2006, which includes the single "Bacco perbacco". He also participated in the album Black Cat released in 2016.

In 1990 he toured with Gloria Gaynor in Italy, and re-recorded "I Will Survive" and "Love Affair" with her.

Miles lives in Orsenigo, Como and is an active musician. Between 2021 and 2022, he took part in the Italian edition of The Voice Senior.

Discography

Albums
1991 – A Love For All Seasons (New Music)
1998 – Arthur Miles Faces The Blues (Tring-Azzurra Records)
1998 – Arthur Miles And The Blues Shakers (Independent)**
2006 – Trust (Independent)
2006 – Flow (Independent)
2006 – Blue Boy (AIPS Assomusica)
2006 – Love And Joy (Independent)
2010 – Blue Avenue (Blue Avenue Productions)
2012 – Living The Blues (Delta Video)
2012 – Live – Arthur Miles and Giorgio Khawam Band (Blue Avenue Productions)
2013 – Emotions Of Love (Blue Avenue Productions)
2018 – My Time For Love (Blue Avenue Productions)
2018 – Language Of Love (Blue Avenue Productions)

Singles
 "Ride On The Power" (Flying Records)
 "We All Need Love" (New Music)
 "Baby I Need Your Loving/She's Back" (New Music)
 "Never Give Up On" (TBA/Flying Records UK)
 "Sunshine Day" (@rt Records)
 "Talking That Trash" (Dance Factory/EMI Music)
 "Be Thankful for What You Got)" (UMD Records/Dig It Int'l)
 "Everybody's Talking" (Dance Factory/EMI Music)
 "Let Your Body" (Sunlite Records/Time srl)
 "Living in Love" (UPD Records)
 "Oh Woman" (Sony Music / Dance Pool)
 "Gimme Your?" (Lupomannaro/Disco Magic)
 "Italy's Finest" (New Music)
 "Don't Listen to Your Heart/Wild" (World New Music)
 "Tripping on Your Love" (New Music/Carrere Records)
 "Move and Groove Your Body" (New Music)
 "Never Stop the Action" (Expanded Music)
 "Hey Mr. DJ" (New Music)
 "Trippin' on Your Love / Helping Hand" (New Music)
 "Rhythm Machine" (Disco Magic)
 "Jivetime Girl" (New Music)
 "I Believe" (Disco Magic)
 "Forever and Two Days/I'm Not in Love" (New Music)
 "You're My Woman" (Flying Records/UMM)
 "Back Away" (D-Division)
 "Victims of Our Love" (New Music)
 "Helping Hand" (FFRR/London Records)
 "We Got a Love" (Disco Holidays Records)
 "You Wanna Get Down" (Sounds Good)
 "Good Times Bad Times" (Blue Avenue Productions)
 "Stronger" (Blue Avenue Productions)
 "Girl You'll Be a Woman Soon" (Independent)
 "You Got Me" (Blue Avenue Productions)
 "Our Love Song" (Blue Avenue Productions)
 "Another Deep End" (Blue Avenue Productions)
 "Build My World Around You" (Blue Avenue Productions)
 "Don't Give It to Another" (Blue Avenue Productions)
 "Handle It Easy" (Blue Avenue Productions)
 "If Ever a Teardrop Falls" (Blue Avenue Productions)
 "Heal The Planet" (Blue Avenue Productions)
 "Let's Get to It" (Blue Avenue Productions)
 "A Girl Like You" (Blue Avenue Productions)
 "I Gotta Feelin'" (Blue Avenue Productions)
 "Come si fa" (Independent)
 "Baila Sexy Thing" (Blue Avenue Productions)

References
 Soul and Jazz Plus -Anno 2 Numero 4 - Estate 1996 - Associazione Culturale Soul & Jazz Society Bologna
 Federic Messent - When the Blues hits the Groove - https://web.archive.org/web/20090120182423/http://indamixworldwide.com/html/article1463.html

External links
 Official website

American jazz singers
Living people
1949 births
American expatriates in Italy
American blues singers
English-language singers from Italy
Italian jazz singers
Italian blues musicians